No End is a 1985 film directed by Krzysztof Kieślowski and starring Grażyna Szapołowska, Maria Pakulnis, and Aleksander Bardini. The film is about the state of martial law in Poland after the banning of the trade union Solidarity in 1981. Kieślowski worked with several regular collaborators for the first time on No End.

Plot
A Polish translator, Ulla (Grażyna Szapołowska), grieves for her recently deceased lawyer husband. As she copes with her loss, the family of her husband's last client, Darek Stach, contacts her in need of legal documents and advice. Ulla struggles with caring for her son, and alternately trying to remember and to forget her husband, while Darek struggles to come to terms with his imprisonment for political dissidence. Ulla's husband's ghost observes these events, occasionally becoming visible to Ulla and Darek.

Cast
 Grażyna Szapołowska as Urszula Zyro
 Maria Pakulnis as Joanna Stach
 Aleksander Bardini as Lawyer Mieczyslaw Labrador
 Artur Barciś as Darek Stach
 Danny Webb as The Englishman
 Jerzy Radziwilowicz as Antek Zyro
 Michal Bajor as Miecio (aplikant)
 Marek Kondrat as Tomek, Antek's friend
 Tadeusz Bradecki as Hipnotyzator
 Krzysztof Krzeminski as Jacek Zyro
 Marzena Trybała as Marta Duraj
 Adam Ferency as Rumcajs (nom de guerre after Rumcajs)
 Elzbieta Kilarska as Antoni's Mother
 Jerzy Kamas as Judge Biedron
 Hanna Dunowska as Justyna
 Jan Tesarz as Joanna's Father
 Andrzej Szalawski as Lawyer

Production
The film was Kieślowski's first writing collaboration with the screenwriter Krzysztof Piesiewicz, who co-wrote the screenplays for all of Kieślowski's subsequent films, and the earliest of his films with music by Zbigniew Preisner, who provided the musical score for most of Kieślowski's subsequent films. As in his later scores, Preisner's music is explicitly referenced by the characters in the film itself, in this case with the main character's son playing the theme on a piano at home.

Reception
No End received positive critical reviews. In his review in The A.V. Club, Noel Murray felt that the film deserved to be "counted among his acknowledged classics." Murray gave it an A+ rating.

In an interview, Kieślowski later said of the film:

In his review in Cinemania, Dan Jardine wrote, "No End is Kieslowski’s dry run for Blue, both are wrenching and lensed studies of one woman’s struggle to deal with the death of loved ones in a larger charged context. Where they differ: While similarly bleak and sorrowful, Blue finds a tortured peace, a painful hope, where No End is a giant sinkhole of despair."

In his review in the Chicago Reader, Jonathan Rosenbaum called the film "terse, suggestive, and pungent, with juicy performances by Bardini and Szapolowska."

On Rotten Tomatoes, the film has an approval rating of 90% based on 10 reviews.

References
Citations

Bibliography

External links
 
 

1985 films
1985 drama films
Films directed by Krzysztof Kieślowski
Films scored by Zbigniew Preisner
Films with screenplays by Krzysztof Piesiewicz
Films with screenplays by Krzysztof Kieślowski
Polish drama films
1980s Polish-language films